The Roewe i6 is a compact sedan produced by SAIC Motor under the Roewe brand, succeeding the Roewe 550. The Roewe ei6 is the hybrid version of the i6. The Roewe i6 was previewed by the Roewe Vision-R, that debuted during the 2015 Guangzhou Auto Show.

Roewe i6 
The Roewe i6, codename IP31, was launched on the 2016 Guangzhou Auto Show in China, as Roewe's new C segment sedan, replacing the aging Roewe 550, and sharing the platform with the second generation MG 6 sedan. It is the first sedan model using the all new "Lv Dong" design philosophy, which means the fusion of oriental aesthetic culture and western design discipline.

Roewe ei6 
The Roewe ei6, codename IP34, is the plug-in hybrid variant of the Roewe i6, and was also launched on the 2016 Guangzhou Auto Show in China. Same as the Roewe RX5 and eRX5, the main styling difference would be the grilles. The petrol version i6 would have a slightly smaller grille, while the hybrid ei6 would have a relatively larger one. The ei6 has  in total, using the 1.0 with an extra  electric motor.

Roewe i6 Max and Roewe ei6 Max 
The Roewe i6 Max and Roewe ei6 Max are larger more premium versions of the i6 series products launched in 2020. The Roewe i6 MAX is  longer and  taller. It features a new family-style front fascia design elements and is adopted With the Ronglin wing grille, the updated design creates a stronger sense of design within the updated Roewe product line. The facelifted headlights are integrated with the grilles, which further enhances the front face visual width.

The Roewe i6 MAX is equipped with the 1.5 liter second-generation Blue Core 300TGI mid-cylinder direct-injection turbocharged engine by SAIC which meets the National VI emission standards. The 7-speed automatic gearbox uses the world's first three-chamber independent lubrication technology.

Rising Auto (Feifan, R) ER6 

The ER6 is the first pure electric sedan from the Roewe brand with the newly introduced “R” emblem based on the i6. The Rising Auto ER6 was officially launched in Shanghai by SAIC in August 2020, it is offered in a total of three different trim levels with the official price ranging from 162,800 yuan to 200,800 yuan (~US$23,443 – 28,915) after subsidies.

The Rising Auto ER6 is powered by an electric motor, TZ204XS1152 produced by Huayu Automotive Electric System Co., Ltd., producing .

As of October 2021, SAIC announced Feifan (非凡) as the Chinese name of the “R” brand with the full name being Feifan Automobile Technology Co., Ltd. and separate the R brand products of SAIC to Feifan automobile. The R brand was originally set as a premium EV brand and was technically under Roewe, and the English name was officially called Rising Auto as of 2022. Starting from the announcement of the Rising Auto and Feifan Automobile name, the original R brand has become an independent company. The cars will still have the R brand logo. On 30 October, Rising Auto became an independent company parallel to IM Motors (another EV subbrand of SAIC).

References

External links

i6
Cars introduced in 2016
2010s cars
Cars of China
Compact cars
Sports sedans
Electric cars
Touring cars
Front-wheel-drive vehicles